Cupidesthes mimetica, the black-spotted ciliate blue, is a butterfly in the family Lycaenidae. The species was first described by Hamilton Herbert Druce in 1910. It is found in Ivory Coast, Ghana, western Nigeria, Cameroon and the Republic of the Congo. The habitat consists of forests.

References

Butterflies described in 1910
Lycaenesthini